Wolverhampton West was a borough constituency in the town of Wolverhampton in the West Midlands of England.  It returned one Member of Parliament (MP)  to the House of Commons of the Parliament of the United Kingdom.

History

The constituency was created by the Redistribution of Seats Act 1885 for the 1885 general election, when the former two-seat Wolverhampton constituency was divided into three single-member constituencies.

It was abolished for the 1950 general election, when it was largely replaced by the new Wolverhampton South West constituency.

Boundaries

1885–1918
The original boundaries of the constituency were set in the sixth schedule of the Redistribution of Seats Act 1885. The seat comprised five wards of the municipal borough of Wolverhampton (St. Mark's, St. Paul's, St. John's, St. George's and St. Matthew's) and the neighbouring Ettingshall area which lay outside the borough boundaries.

1918-1950
Constituencies throughout Great Britain and Ireland were redrawn by the Representation of the People Act 1918. Wolverhampton's municipal boundaries had been enlarged and it had become a county borough in the period since 1885. The Wolverhampton West seat was redefined to reflect this, and was described as comprising nine wards of the county borough: Blakenhall, Dunstall, Graiseley, Merridale, Park, St. George's, St. John's, St. Mark's and St. Matthew's.

Members of Parliament 

1 Brown was elected in 1929, as a Labour Party candidate, but later sat as an "Independent Labour" MP. He sought re-election in 1931 and 1935 as an Independent Labour candidate, opposed in 1935 by an official Labour Party candidate, but lost on both occasions

Election results

Elections in the 1880s

Elections in the 1890s

Elections in the 1900s

Elections in the 1910s

Elections in the 1920s

Elections in the 1930s

Elections in the 1940s

See also
 List of Members of Parliament for Wolverhampton
 List of parliamentary constituencies in Wolverhampton

References 
 

Parliamentary constituencies in Wolverhampton
Parliamentary constituencies in the West Midlands (county) (historic)
Parliamentary constituencies in Staffordshire (historic)
Constituencies of the Parliament of the United Kingdom established in 1885
Constituencies of the Parliament of the United Kingdom disestablished in 1950